Marine Heavy Helicopter Squadron 366 (HMH-366) is a United States Marine Corps helicopter squadron consisting of CH-53E Super Stallion heavy transport helicopters. The squadron, known as the "Hammerheads", is based at Marine Corps Air Station New River and falls under the command of Marine Aircraft Group 29 and the 2nd Marine Aircraft Wing. The squadron's tail code is “HH.”   At their activation on September 30, 2008, the squadron had 130 Marines and 8 aircraft on-hand which grew to more than 300 Marines and 16 aircraft in 2009.

Mission 
Provide assault support transport of combat troops, supplies and equipment during expeditionary, joint or combined operations. Be prepared for short-notice, worldwide employment in support of Marine Air-Ground Task Force operations.

History 

Marine Heavy Helicopter Squadron-366 (HMH-366) was originally activated on September 30, 1994 at MCAS Kaneohe Bay, Hawaii as part of Aviation Support Element Kaneohe (ASEK). As the fourth active CH-53D Sea Stallion squadron, it was the only Hawaiian home-grown helicopter squadron in active service in the Marine Corps.  The squadron's callsign, "Hammerhead," was inspired by the fact that Kaneohe Bay is home to the world's largest hammerhead shark population, and the original unit patch featured a hammerhead shark leaping over an airborne CH-53D.

While active in Hawaii, the squadron deployed to the Pacific Missile Range Facility (PMRF), Barking Sands on Kauai, the Pohakuloa Training Area on the Big Island, and completed a successful mainland deployment in support of Combined Arms Exercises (CAX) 9-98 and 10-98, and Weapons and Tactics Instructors Course (WTI) 2-00. The squadron also supported a four aircraft deployment to Dhaka, Bangladesh for presidential support of President Clinton's visit to the country.  On 1 October 2000, with a limited number of available CH-53Ds in the Marine Corps, and no addition CH-53Ds being produced, the squadron was de-activated as part of a realignment plan to redistribute the units’ personnel and aircraft to the remaining three CH-53D squadrons in Hawaii (HMH-362, HMH-363, HMH-463), thereby increasing the Primary Authorized Aircraft (PAA) of those squadrons from eight to ten aircraft.

The squadron was reactivated on 30 September 2008 as part of the Marine Corp's expansion.  Since then the Squadron has participated in the last HMH rotation in support of Operation Enduring Freedom in 2014 and Exercise Trident Juncture which took place in Norway in 2018.

(HMH-366) deactivation ceremony at Marine Corps Air Station New River, North Carolina, Dec. 16, 2022.

Unit awards
A unit citation or commendation is an award bestowed upon an organization for the action cited. Members of the unit who participated in said actions are allowed to wear on their uniforms the awarded unit citation. HMH-366 has been presented with the following award:

See also 

 United States Marine Corps Aviation
 List of inactive United States Marine Corps aircraft squadrons

References
Notes

Bibliography

Web

External links
 HMH-366's official website

H366